His Master's Voice is a famous painting and trademark in the recording industry and the informal name of a British record label.

His Master's Voice may refer to:
 HMV, a British music retailer
 His Master's Voice (novel), a 1968 novel by Stanisław Lem
 His Master's Voice (Hannu Rajaniemi story), short story by Hannu Rajaniemi
 His Master's Voice (radio series), a satirical comedy series on BBC Radio 4
 His Master's Voice (1925 film), an American silent war drama film
 His Master's Voice (2018 film), a Hungarian science-fiction film
 "His Master's Voice", a song by Monsters of Folk from the 2009 album Monsters of Folk